In trigonometry, tangent half-angle formulas relate the tangent of half of an angle to trigonometric functions of the entire angle. The tangent of half an angle is the stereographic projection of the circle onto a line. Among these formulas are the following:

From these one can derive identities expressing the sine, cosine, and tangent as functions of tangents of half-angles:

Proofs

Algebraic proofs
Using double-angle formulae and the Pythagorean identity  gives

 

 

Taking the quotient of the formulae for sine and cosine yields

 

Combining the Pythagorean identity with the double-angle formula for the cosine, 

rearranging, and taking the square roots yields 

   and  

which, upon division gives

  

Alternatively, 

It turns out that the absolute value signs in these last two formulas may be dropped, regardless of which quadrant  is in.  With or without the absolute value bars these formulas do not apply when both the numerator and denominator on the right-hand side are zero.

Also, using the angle addition and subtraction formulae for both the sine and cosine one obtains:

 

 

 

 

Pairwise addition of the above four formulae yields:

 

 

Dividing the sum of sines by the sum of cosines one arrives at:

Geometric proofs 

Applying the formulae derived above to the rhombus figure on the right, it is readily shown that

 

In the unit circle, application of the above shows that . By similarity of triangles,

 .

It follows that

The tangent half-angle substitution in integral calculus 

In various applications of trigonometry, it is useful to rewrite the trigonometric functions (such as sine and cosine) in terms of rational functions of a new variable .

Geometrically, the construction goes like this: for any point  on the unit circle, draw the line passing through it and the point . This point crosses the -axis at some point . One can show using simple geometry that . The equation for the intersection of the line and circle is then a quadratic equation involving .

Thus, the tangent half-angle formulae give conversions between the stereographic coordinate  on the unit circle and the standard angular coordinate .

Then we have

 

and

 

After setting

This implies that

for some integer , and therefore

Hyperbolic identities
One can play an entirely analogous game with the hyperbolic functions. A point on (the right branch of) a hyperbola is given by . Projecting this onto -axis from the center  gives the following:

with the identities

 

and

 

Finding  in terms of  leads to following relationship between the inverse hyperbolic tangent  and the natural logarithm:

The Gudermannian function

If we identify the parameter  in both cases we arrive at a relationship between the circular functions and the hyperbolic ones. That is, if

then

where  is the Gudermannian function. The Gudermannian function gives a direct relationship between the circular functions and the hyperbolic ones that does not involve complex numbers. The above descriptions of the tangent half-angle formulae (projection the unit circle and standard hyperbola onto the -axis) give a geometric interpretation of this function.

Rational values and Pythagorean triples

This is helpful with Pythagorean triples; each interior angle has a rational sine because of the SAS area formula for a triangle and has a rational cosine because of the Law of Cosines. These imply that the half-angle tangent is necessarily rational. Vice versa, when a half-angle tangent is a rational number in the interval  then the full-angle sine and cosine will both be rational, and there is a right triangle that has the full angle and that has side lengths that are a Pythagorean triple.

Generally, if  is a subfield of the complex numbers then  implies that }.

See also

List of trigonometric identities
Half-side formula

External links

 Tangent Of Halved Angle at Planetmath
 

Trigonometry
Conic sections
Mathematical identities